Sehome (Lummi: six̠ʷóm), also called Sehome Hill, is a forested hill in Bellingham, Washington. The Sehome Hill Arboretum is an  park of second growth forest is located on the hill, adjacent to the campus of Western Washington University. Though called an arboretum, the hilly expanse atop Sehome is not consciously planted as an exhibit of tree species, but naturally wooded and rich in the plant species (both native and nonnative) typical of the region. The arboretum is jointly managed by both the university and the city.  Its care is overseen by the Sehome Arboretum Board of Governors, composed of city employees, university employees, university students, and city residents. The park offers students and city dwellers over 5 miles (8 km) of public trails for walking and running and, in some areas, bicycling.  Unique features of the park include an  wooden observation tower atop Sehome, with aerial views of Bellingham Bay to the south. There is also a large tunnel, hand cut into rock in 1923, originally used for car traffic in the early 1900s. Its tall, thin shape shows its creation for cars like Model T Fords of the day. Cars are no longer allowed in the tunnel and it is part of a trail along which hikers can walk.

Arboretum history

In the 1850s, coal-mining claims were made on Sehome and two coal scouts named Henry Hewitt and William Brown who were working for Henry Roeder's lumber mill found coal. The Bellingham Bay Coal Company was founded and began work in 1855. Tunnels are said to be laced through Sehome Arboretum but their exact locations and the tunnel's entrances are no longer known. Logging has taken place in the arboretum since the 1800s with operations ongoing as recently as 1906. The land became a park in 1922 and an arboretum in 1967, with the closure of most of the park to automobiles.

Native plants
The Arboretum contains the following plant species:

Trees
Douglas Fir
Western Hemlock
Western Redcedar
Alder
Bigleaf Maple
Shrubs
Oregon-grape
Indian Plum
Snowberry
Oceanspray
Salal
Blue Elderberry
Red Elderberry
Red Huckleberry
Saskatoon
Thimbleberry

Invasive plants
A number of invasive plants grow inside the arboretum, including:

English Ivy
Vinca sp.
Variegated Yellow Archangel

See also 
List of botanical gardens in the United States

External links
WWU Sehome Hill Arboretum website

Arboreta in Washington (state)
Parks in Whatcom County, Washington
Botanical gardens in Washington (state)
Geography of Bellingham, Washington
Tourist attractions in Bellingham, Washington